Jaason Simmons (born 12 July 1970) is an Australian actor best known for the role of Logan Fowler on the TV series Baywatch.

Biography

Early life and career
Born as Jaason Matthew Simmons in Hobart, Tasmania, he attended Warrane Primary School as a child and first began acting in 1993 with a role on the short-lived Australian series Paradise Beach. The following year, he won the role of Logan Fowler on Baywatch. After leaving the series in 1997, Simmons appeared in several theater productions in London and had roles in several independent films including the 1997 film Nowhere. Some of his most recent onscreen appearances have been in the 2006 cult film Mad Cowgirl and in the 2013 SyFy movie Sharknado.

Personal life
Simmons came out as gay in the March 2008 issue of Australian New Idea magazine with his fiancé Irish actor John O'Callaghan.

Filmography

References

External links
 
 
 NY Times filmography
 

1970 births
Living people
Australian male film actors
Australian male stage actors
Australian male television actors
Australian gay actors
Male actors from Hobart